Arrianus may refer to:

Arrianus (bishop), bishop of Ionia, (c. 363-?) and an Anomoean
Arrianus (jurist), Roman jurisconsult
Arrianus (poet), Greek poet who made a Greek translation in hexameter verse of Virgil's Georgics, possibly conflated with Adrianus (poet)
Lucius Annius Arrianus, Roman consul 243 AD

See also
Arianus (disambiguation)
Arius